All the Stuff (And More)-Vol 1 is an album by The Huntingtons released in 1998. It is a re-release of the band's debut disc, Sweet Sixteen, plus ten bonus tracks.

Track listing
I Really Don't Like It
Mom's in Rehab
JW
She's Probably Over Me
Nicki Loves Her LSD
She's So Uncool
You Again
Martin's Pretty Girls
She's Comin' to the Show
Teenage Queen
She's Alright
Rock 'n' Roll Girl
Heidi Hates Me
Veronica
Drexel U
Heavy Metal's Alive in Baltimore
There She Goes
Secret Agent Johnny Bravo
Be My Baby
Looks That Kill
We're Not Gonna Take It
Do You Remember Rock 'n' Roll Radio
True to You
I'm So Stupid
Wimpy Drives Through Harlem
Talk Dirty to Me
Don't Leave Me in the Hospital
Pinhead
Drexel U (Live)

All songs written by Huntingtons, except track 19 by The Ronettes, track 20 by Mötley Crüe, track 21 by Twisted Sister, tracks 22 & 28 by Ramones, track 25 by The Queers and track 26 by Poison.

Personnel
Mikey Huntington – vocals, bass
Cliffy Huntington – guitar, vocals
Mikee Huntington – drums

References

The Huntingtons compilation albums
1998 compilation albums